Lake Clearwater is a village in the Ashburton District of New Zealand next to a lake of the same name. A basic camp ground is located between the village and the lake.

Demographics

Ashburton Lakes had a population of 96 at the 2018 New Zealand census, a decrease of 6 people (-5.9%) since the 2013 census, and an increase of 6 people (6.7%) since the 2006 census. There were 57 households. There were 48 males and 48 females, giving a sex ratio of 1.0 males per female. The median age was 32.3 years (compared with 37.4 years nationally), with 18 people (18.8%) aged under 15 years, 27 (28.1%) aged 15 to 29, 45 (46.9%) aged 30 to 64, and 3 (3.1%) aged 65 or older.

Ethnicities were 96.9% European/Pākehā, 3.1% Māori, and 3.1% other ethnicities (totals add to more than 100% since people could identify with multiple ethnicities).

The proportion of people born overseas was 6.2%, compared with 27.1% nationally.

Although some people objected to giving their religion, 56.2% had no religion and 37.5% were Christian.

Of those at least 15 years old, 15 (19.2%) people had a bachelor or higher degree, and 9 (11.5%) people had no formal qualifications. The median income was $33,000, compared with $31,800 nationally. The employment status of those at least 15 was that 51 (65.4%) people were employed full-time and 12 (15.4%) were part-time.

References 

Ashburton District
Populated places in Canterbury, New Zealand